Chant public devant deux chaises électriques (Public Canto Before Two Electric Chairs) is a play by Armand Gatti written in 1964 and premiered in 1966 at the Théâtre National Populaire. The subject is the Sacco and Vanzetti affair. It made headlines, and was panned by some critics but praised as a masterpiece by others, such as Gérard Guillot.

References

Bibliography 

 Laura Bellina, Le Chant public d’Armand Gatti, Università Ca’Foscari, Venise, Italie, 1971
 Jérémy Mahut, La Représentation de l’Anarchie comme exemple de Théâtre-témoignage : dans Chant public devant deux chaises électriques, pièce d’Armand Gatti, Morte accidentale di un anarchico, pièce de Dario Fo et Gods of the lightning, pièce de Maxwell Anderson, université de Reims, 2007
 Gérard Guillot,  Chant public devant deux chaises électriques d'Armand Gatti, au TNP. Notre agonie, c'est notre triomphe, Les Lettres françaises no. 1117, 1966-02-03, pp. 16–17
 
 

1966 plays
French plays
Works about Sacco and Vanzetti